The Government of Sri Lanka maintains intelligence agencies that conduct intelligence activities to support the national security of Sri Lanka. Their intelligence assessments contribute to the conduct of national security, military planning and law enforcement. The main organisations are the State Intelligence Service and the Directorate of Military Intelligence. These intelligence agencies are coordinated by the Chief of National Intelligence (CNI), who reports to the Secretary of Defense.

Current agencies
Sri Lanka Police
State Intelligence Service
Special Branch
Terrorist Investigation Division 
Criminal Investigation Department
Sri Lanka Army
Directorate of Military Intelligence
Military Intelligence Corps
Sri Lanka Navy
Department of Naval Intelligence
Sri Lanka Air Force
Directorate of Air Intelligence
Central Bank of Sri Lanka
Financial Intelligence Unit (Sri Lanka),

History

Colonial era
Formal intelligence gathering was established in the 19th century by the colonial government of Ceylon with the Police Ordinance No.16 of 1865 which give the Ceylon Police Force provisions to "collect and communicate intelligence affecting the public peace". With the establishment of the Criminal Investigation Department (CID) in the Ceylon Police Force in 1870, intelligence gathering and investigations in the internal security were undertaken by the CID.

Post independence
Following Ceylon's independence in 1948, the police department came under the Ministry of External Affairs and Defence and continued its traditional role in intelligence. The police failed to detect the attempt military coup in 1962 until CID was notified in the eleventh-hour by one of the plotters, allowing CID and armed forces to prevent the coup from taking place. In 1966, the CID was able to detect another possible attempt coup. The Special Branch was created as part of the CID in 1966, however it was disbanded by Sirimavo Bandaranaike after she was elected as prime minister in 1970.

1971 JVP Insurrection
Although CID investigations had taken place in to the Che Guevara clique and the arrest of JVP leader Rohana Wijeweera; the police failed to gauge scale and magnitude of the JVP insurrection which was launched in April 1971 taking the Bandaranaike government off-guard. In the months that followed, the government gained the assistance of British MI5 in counterinsurgency operations against the JVP. The police with the armed forces carried-out internal security operations to identify JVP carders and sympathizers in the community and within the government. Notable arrests included Captain Ravi Jayewardene, S. D. Bandaranayake and Susil Siriwardene.

Civil War
By the 1980s Tamil militancy was on the rise and the Police Special Branch functioning under the Intelligence Services Division of the Sri Lanka Police, undertook national (local) intelligence functions. The perceived failure of the Intelligence Services Division during the riots of July 1983 led the J.R. Jayawardene government to reevaluate the nation's intelligence network, and in 1984 the President Jayawardene set up a National Intelligence Bureau (NIB). The new organization combined intelligence units from the army, navy, air force, and police. It was headed by a deputy inspector general of police who reported directly to the Ministry of Defence.

In 1990, the Directorate of Military Intelligence and the Military Intelligence Corps was established formalizing the ad-hoc military intelligence units that existed prior to it. Military intelligence units had been involved in counterinsurgency operations with the police during the early stages of the Civil war in the north and east of the island and the 1987–89 JVP Insurrection in the south of the island, leading to the capture of JVP leader Rohana Wijeweera.

The NIB which had been deemed ineffective with major military and intelligence setbacks during the third phase of the war. It was restructured in 2003 as the State Intelligence Service (SIS) bringing all military and police intelligence agencies under the preview of the newly created post of Chief of National Intelligence under the Ministry of Defence. Significant intelligence triumphs during the war included the defection of Karuna amman; capture of Kumaran Pathmanathan aka KP, who was involved in arms procurement for LTTE, was captured in Malaysia and moved to Sri Lanka via Thailand by the SIS; interception of LTTE arms supplies in the high seas and killing of S. P. Thamilselvan by an airstrike.

See also
Sri Lankan cyber security community
British intelligence agencies

References

 
Lists of intelligence agencies
Intelligence
Intelligence communities